Andrew McMillen is an Australian music journalist and national music writer for The Australian.

Early life and education
McMillen grew up in the southern Queensland, Australia city of Bundaberg, the son of two teachers. He relocated to the state capital city, Brisbane, in 2006 to study for a communication studies degree at the University of Queensland.

Writing
McMillen's book Talking Smack: Honest Conversations About Drugs was published in 2014 by University of Queensland Press. David Messer of The Sydney Morning Herald called the work "a brave and important book" and noted that McMillen was "careful to provide a balance of experiences, including [those of] non-drug takers." Toby Creswell of The Newton Review of Books wrote that the "real interest" in the book "is not so much the drug tales which...are fairly repetitive" but "the insights that McMillen gives into the creative processes of [the interviewed] artists".

References

External links

Australian journalists
Living people
Year of birth missing (living people)